Dennis Decha Wanjala (born 10 August 1998) is a left-back currently in the ranks of Kenyan Premier League side Nairobi City Stars
 from the beginning of the 2021–22 FKF Premier Leagueseason.

Career
Wanjala previously played for Nzoia Sugar F.C. whom he joined at the onset of the 2018 season straight out of high school. He earned his Kenyan Premier League debut for the side in an away game against Mathare United at the Kenyatta Stadium, Machakos on Sun 11 Feb 2018. 

After four seasons at Nzoia Sugar F.C., Wanjala joined City Stars  on a three-year deal.

References

External links
 

1998 births
Living people
Kenyan footballers
Kenyan Premier League players
Nairobi City Stars players